The Fourth Horseman is a 1932 American Western film directed by Hamilton MacFadden and written by Jack Cunningham. The film stars Tom Mix, Margaret Lindsay, Fred Kohler, Donald Kirke, Raymond Hatton and Buddy Roosevelt. It was released on September 25, 1932, by Universal Pictures.

Cast 
Tom Mix as Tom Martin
Margaret Lindsay as Molly O'Rourke
Fred Kohler as Honest Ben Jones
Donald Kirke as Henchman Thad
Raymond Hatton as Tax Clerk Gabby
Buddy Roosevelt as Fancy
Grace Cunard as Mrs. Elmer Brown
Fred Howard as Elmer Brown  
Helene Millard as 'Baby-Face'
C.E. Anderson as Caleb Winters 
Harry Allen as Charlie
Herman Nowlin as Bill Thrasher 
Duke R. Lee as Henchman Jim 
Tony the Horse as Tom's Horse

Plot
Former train robber Jones wants to take control of Stillwell, a ghost town that is owned by O'Rourke. Martin suspects that Jones has evil intentions and works to undermine the scheme.

References

External links 
 

1932 films
American Western (genre) films
1932 Western (genre) films
Universal Pictures films
Films directed by Hamilton MacFadden
American black-and-white films
1930s English-language films
1930s American films